Pseudonebularia wareni is a species of sea snail, a marine gastropod mollusk in the family Mitridae, the miters or miter snails.

Description

Distribution
This marine species occurs off the Philippines.

References

 Poppe G.T., Tagaro S. & Salisbury R. (2009) New species of Mitridae and Costellariidae from the Philippines. Visaya Suppl. 4: 1-86

External links
 Fedosov A., Puillandre N., Herrmann M., Kantor Yu., Oliverio M., Dgebuadze P., Modica M.V. & Bouchet P. (2018). The collapse of Mitra: molecular systematics and morphology of the Mitridae (Gastropoda: Neogastropoda). Zoological Journal of the Linnean Society. 183(2): 253-337

Mitridae
Gastropods described in 2009